The women's 100 metre breaststroke competition at the 1999 Pan Pacific Swimming Championships took place on August 23–24 at the Sydney International Aquatic Centre.  The last champion was Samantha Riley of AUS.

This race consisted of two lengths of the pool, both lengths being in breaststroke.

Records
Prior to this competition, the existing world and Pan Pacific records were as follows:

Results
All times are in minutes and seconds.

Heats
The first round was held on August 23.

Semifinals
The semifinals were held on August 23.

Final 
The final was held on August 24.

References

1999 Pan Pacific Swimming Championships
1999 in women's swimming